The counselor of the United States Department of State is a position within the United States Department of State that serves the secretary of state as a special advisor and consultant on major problems of foreign policy and who provides guidance to the appropriate bureaus with respect to such matters. The counselor conducts special international negotiations and consultations, and also undertakes special assignments from time to time, as directed by the secretary of state. Currently, the counselor holds under law a rank equivalent to that of under secretary of state. Unlike the other under secretaries of state, the counselor currently does not require Senate confirmation. Historically, the role was appointed by the president, by and with the advice and consent of the United States Senate as authorized by 22 U.S. Code § 2651a as one of four "other senior officials."

The secretary of state created the position of counselor for the Department of State in 1909 as part of a general department reorganization. In 1912, the position became a presidential appointment. Between 1913 and 1919, the counselor served as the department's second-ranking officer, assuming the role previously exercised by the assistant secretary of state. In 1919, the newly created position of under secretary of state subsumed the duties of the counselor. An Act of Congress, May 18, 1937, re-established the position of counselor of the Department of State. Between 1961 and 1966, the counselor also served as the chairman of the Policy Planning Council. On April 30, 1994, the title was changed to under secretary of state for global affairs when Counselor Timothy E. Wirth was appointed to that position, but another counselor was appointed in 1997.

List of counselors of the United States Department of State

References

 
1909 establishments in Washington, D.C.
United States diplomacy